10:1 is an EP released by Rogue Wave. It was released August 23, 2005 on Sub Pop Records. 10:1 peaked at number 14 on the Billboard Hot Single Sales chart.

Track listing
All songs written by Zach Rogue.
 "10:1" – 3:19	
 "Interruptions" – 4:50	
 "Wait for It" – 2:30	
 "Crush the Camera" – 3:00

Personnel
 Zach Rogue - vocals, acoustic guitar, wurlitzer, producer, hammond, rhodes piano
 Pat Spurgeon - bass, drums, autoharp, wind chimes, timpani, guitar effects, percussion
 Bill Racine - producer, engineer, mixing, "guitar mutilation"
 Gram LeBron - rhodes piano, vocals
 Evan Farrell - bass, vocals
 Emily Lazar - mastering
 Jeff Kleinsmith - artwork, design

References

External links
Rogue Wave official website
Rogue Wave on MySpace

Rogue Wave (band) EPs
2005 EPs
Sub Pop EPs
Albums recorded at Tarbox Road Studios